Cosmic Hallelujah is the seventeenth studio album by American country music artist Kenny Chesney. It was released on October 28, 2016, by Blue Chair and Columbia Nashville. The album was originally scheduled for release July 8, 2016, under the title Some Town Somewhere.

The song "Jesus and Elvis" also appears on songwriter Hayes Carll's 2019 album What It Is.

Critical reception 

Cosmic Hallelujah has generally received positive reviews from critics.

Stephen Thomas Erlewine of AllMusic gave the album a very positive review, saying that "Chesney is determined to connect with his times without abandoning himself, and the result is one of his best records."

Maura Johnston of The Boston Globe also gave the album a positive review, saying that "Chesney isn’t one to rest on his laurels, and his 17th album, Cosmic Hallelujah, bears that out."

Accolades

Commercial performance
Cosmic Hallelujah debuted at number two on the US Billboard 200 chart with 89,000 units, with 79,000 of that figure being pure album sales. It was the best-selling album of the week in terms of physical sales and downloads. The album also debuted at number one on the Top Country Albums chart.  As of December 2017, the album has sold 239,500 copies in the United States.

Track listing

Personnel
 Wyatt Beard – background vocals
 Kenny Chesney – lead vocals
 Ross Copperman – background vocals
 Chad Cromwell – drums
 Kenny Greenberg – acoustic guitar, electric guitar
 Jesse Frasure – background vocals
 David Huff – percussion, programming
 Brett James – background vocals
 Shane McAnally – background vocals
 Rob McNelley – electric guitar
 Allison Moorer – background vocals on "Jesus and Elvis"
 Heather Morgan – background vocals
 Greg Morrow – drums, cowbell
 David Lee Murphy – background vocals
 Josh Osborne – background vocals
 Pink – duet vocals on "Setting the World on Fire"
 Danny Rader – banjo, bouzouki, acoustic guitar, tres
 Michael Rhodes – bass guitar
 Mike Rojas – accordion, keyboards, Hammond organ, piano, synthesizer, Wurlitzer
 F. Reid Shippen – programming, Wurlitzer
 Jimmie Lee Sloas – bass guitar
 Caitlyn Smith – backing vocals on "All the Pretty Girls" 
 Derek Wells – acoustic guitar, electric guitar

Charts

Weekly charts

Year-end charts

Singles

Certifications

References

2016 albums
Kenny Chesney albums
Columbia Records albums
Albums produced by Buddy Cannon